The Coast Guard Court of Criminal Appeals (CGCCA) is the intermediate appellate court for criminal convictions in the U.S. Coast Guard.  It is located in Washington, DC.

The Court was established under Article 66, Uniform Code of Military Justice (UCMJ), by the Judge Advocate General of the Coast Guard. The Court is normally composed of five appellate military judges, organized in panels of three for consideration of referred cases. All but the Chief Judge have other primary duties, so that their service on the Court constitutes a collateral duty.

Jurisdiction

Review of courts-martial

In general, the Court reviews and acts on the records by affirming, reversing, or modifying in part the findings or sentence in each case of trial by court-martial in which the sentence, as approved, extends to death; dismissal of a commissioned officer or cadet; dishonorable discharge; bad conduct discharge; or confinement of one year or more. The Court also reviews other courts-martial with lesser sentences if the Judge Advocate General so directs.

After CGCCA review, the next level of appeal is to the United States Court of Appeals for the Armed Forces.

Writ review
Also reviewed by the Court are petitions for extraordinary writs, petitions for new trial which have been referred to the Court, and appeals by the United States under Article 62, UCMJ.

Current Composition of the Court
The judges may be commissioned officers or civilians. As of 2019, the Court is constituted as follows:
Chief Judge Lane I. McClelland
Judge John F. Havranek
Judge Robert W. Bruce
Judge Brian M. Judge
Judge Jason R. Hamilton
Judge Kurt J. Brubaker
Judge Brian K. Koshulsky
Judge Christopher P. Mooradian

See also
Court-martial
Coast Guard Legal Division
Coast Guard Investigative Service
Army Court of Criminal Appeals
Navy-Marine Corps Court of Criminal Appeals
Air Force Court of Criminal Appeals

External links
 Coast Guard Court of Criminal Appeals

References

United States Coast Guard Legal Division
Article I tribunals
United States military courts
Courts-martial in the United States
1968 establishments in the United States
Courts and tribunals established in 1968